Snowboard Magazine is an independent snowboarding publication. It was founded in April 2004 by Mark Sullivan and Liz Sullivan in Hailey, Idaho. Soon they were joined by Jeff Baker, Jeff Douglass, Aaron Draplin, Gary Hansen and Jason "J2" Rasmus. Most of the crew were previous employees and/or contracted employees of Snowboarder Magazine. Until 2007 Mark Sullivan was also the publisher. The magazine was the first product focused magazine in snowboarding, quickly set trends for competing titles to follow and quickly became the third largest snowboarding publication in the world. In 2011 Snowboard Magazine was sold to Storm Mountain Publishing, publishers of Freeskier Magazine, which is based in Boulder, Colorado.

In February 2016 the print edition of Snowboard ceased publication and it went on online.

References

External links
 Snowboard-mag.com

Defunct magazines published in the United States
Magazines established in 2004
Magazines disestablished in 2016
Magazines published in Colorado
Magazines published in Idaho
Online magazines with defunct print editions
Online magazines published in the United States
Sports magazines published in the United States
Snowboarding magazines